Bain or Bains is an English, French, Punjabi (Jatt), and Scottish surname. It may also be a variant form of a German surname.

Bains shares many of the origins of the surname Baines.

Origin of the surname

Northern English
There are two origins for the Northern English surname.
The northern English surname Bains is sometimes derived from a nickname meaning "bone", which probably referred to someone who was exceptionally tall, or lean. This nickname is derived from the Old English ban, meaning "bone". In northern dialects of Middle English, the a was preserved, but in southern dialects the a was changed to o (the southern form became the standard).
In other cases, the northern English surname is derived from a nickname of a hospitable person. This nickname is derived from the northern Middle English beyn, bayn, which mean "welcoming", "friendly"; these are in turn derived from the Old Norse beinn, meaning "straight", "direct".

English/French
An English and French origin of the surname Bains is from the occupational name of an attendant of a public bath house. This name is derived from the Middle English, and Old French baine, meaning "bath".

French
There are several other derivations of the French surname.
One French derivation of the surname Bains is from a topographic name, for someone who lived near a Roman bath. This name is derived from the Old French baine, meaning "bath".
In other cases, the name may originate from a habitational name, derived from a place in Ille-et-Vilaine.

Scottish
The Scottish surname Bains is derived from a nickname for a person with fair-hair. This name is derived from the Scottish Gaelic bàn, meaning "white", "fair". The name was common in the Scottish Highlands, and is first recorded in 1324 in Perth. The surname can also be, in some cases, a reduced form of the surname McBain. The Scottish Gaelic form of the surname Bains is Bàins (masculine), and Bhàin (feminine).

German
The name may also be a variant spelling of the north German surname Behn.

Punjabi

The Punjabi surname Bains is common amongst Punjabi Jats, which is the name of the Jat clan.

People with the surname 
 Addison Bain, NASA scientist
 Alexander Bain (philosopher) (1818–1903), Scottish philosopher and educationist
 Alexander Bain (inventor) (1811–1877), Scottish instrument inventor, technician, and clockmaker
 Aly Bain (born 1946), Scottish fiddler
 Andrew Geddes Bain (–1864), South African geologist, road engineer, palaeontology and explorer
 Atu Emberson Bain, Fijian political leader
 Barbara Bain (born 1931), American actress
 Barbara J. Bain, Australian professor of haematology
 Bill Bain (disambiguation), several persons
 Bonar Bain (1923–2005), Canadian actor and identical twin brother of Conrad Bains
 Conrad Bain (1923–2013), Canadian actor and identical twin brother of Bonar Bains
 Dan Bain (1874–1962), Canadian athlete and merchant
 David Bain (born 1972), New Zealander associated with one of that country's most notable murder cases
 Donald Bain (disambiguation), several persons
 Edgar Bain (1891–1971), American metallurgist
 Ewen Bain (1925–1989), Scottish cartoonist
 F. W. Bain (1863–1940), British writer
 George Bain (disambiguation), several persons
 Harry Bains, Canadian politician
 H. Foster Bain (1871–1948), American geologist
 Jean Bain, Australian basketball player
 James Bain (disambiguation), several persons
 Jimmy Bain (1947–2016), Scottish bassist
 Joe S. Bain (1912–1991), American economist
 John P. Bain or TotalBiscuit (1984–2018), British game critic and commentator
 Ken Bain, American professor and author
 Kevin Bain (born 1972), Scottish footballer
 Mary Monnett Bain (1833–1885), American Methodist
 Raymone Bain, spokeswoman from the public relations firm Davis, Bain & Associates Inc.
 Robert Bain (disambiguation), several people
 Robin Bain (born 1980), American actress
 Sam Bain (born 1971), British television writer
 Thomas Bain (1834–1915), Canadian parliamentarian
 Wilfred Conwell Bain (1908–1997), American music educator
 William Bain (disambiguation), several persons

References

English-language surnames
French-language surnames
German-language surnames
Scottish Gaelic-language surnames